Vrakbukta (The Wreck Bay) is a bay at the northwestern side of Kongsøya in Kong Karls Land, Svalbard. It is located between Retziusfjellet and the headland of Kennedyneset.

References

Bays of Svalbard
Kongsøya